Robert Thorogood (born 1972) is an English screenwriter and novelist. He is the creator of the BBC One murder mystery series Death in Paradise. He won France Film's "En Route to France" award in 2012.

Early life
Thorogood was educated at Uppingham School in Rutland where he met his future wife, Classic FM presenter Katie Breathwick. He read History at Downing College, Cambridge, where he toured with the university's student comedy troupe Footlights in 1993 and was elected president in 1994. Soon after leaving Cambridge Thorogood set up a theatre company that toured small theatres and schools, the highlight of which was a production of Molière's The Miser that he directed and acted in alongside Robert Webb, David Mitchell and Olivia Colman.

Writing career
Thorogood wrote for many years – offering scripts to the BBC, ITV and independent film companies – but before 2011 the only script of his that was actually produced was a Radio 4 afternoon drama play called From Abstraction, about the life of mathematician Paul Wolfskehl.

In 2008, Thorogood entered the inaugural Red Planet Prize and was a chosen finalist, where he was able to pitch his 'Copper in the Caribbean' idea to Tony Jordan. In 2011, the show was finally broadcast.

Death in Paradise
Thorogood wrote five episodes of the first series of Death in Paradise. The first episode aired in November 2011 to an overnight audience of nearly 6 million. The first episode of the second series aired in 2013 to an overnight audience of nearly 7 million. Thorogood also wrote two episodes on the second series, three of the third series, and one episode in each of the following series, except for the tenth series. In February 2019 it was announced by the BBC that the show had been commissioned for series nine and ten.

Spin-off novels
In January 2014, it was announced that Thorogood had signed a deal with MIRA / Harlequin to write three Richard Poole Murder Mystery novels. The first of the three – A Meditation on Murder – was published in hardback in January 2015 and in paperback in May 2015.
The second – The Killing of Polly Carter – was published in hardback in December 2015 and in paperback in early 2016. The third – Death Knocks Twice – was published in hardback in July 2017 and in paperback in October 2017. Murder in the Caribbean, the fourth mystery, was published in December 2018.

The Marlow Murder Club
In 2020 it was announced that Thorogood was writing a brand new murder mystery novel, The Marlow Murder Club. It focuses on a group of older women who form a club to investigate a series of killings in Marlow. It was published in January 2021 to overwhelmingly positive reviews and was chosen as the Booksellers' Association's Book of the Month. The second book in the series, Death Comes to Marlow, was nominated for an Edgar Allan Poe award for Best Cosy Crime novel published in the USA in 2022.

Trackers
In 2018, it was announced that Thorogood was showrunning Trackers, a major new TV series set in South Africa, and an adaptation of the novel Trackers by Deon Meyer. Just as Death in Paradise pioneered the first co-production between the BBC and France Televisions, Trackers was the first co-production between M-Net in South Africa, ZDF in Germany and HBO's sister station Cinemax in America.

Just before the last episode aired in South Africa, it was already M-Net's best-performing show of the year.

Speaking
Thorogood was a guest speaker at the 2012 London Screenwriters Festival. Since then, he has spoken about creating international co-productions for the European TV Drama Series Lab in Berlin and at the Totally Serialised TV Festival in London in 2014. He has also been an after-dinner speaker at the Dagger Awards for the Crime Writers Association in 2017 and Bristol Crimefest in both 2018 and 2019.

References

External links
 
 Robert Thorogood at the Knight Hall Agency
 Robert Thorogood's novels at Amazon

1972 births
Living people
Alumni of Downing College, Cambridge
People educated at Uppingham School
21st-century British novelists
British television writers
British male novelists
English television writers
English screenwriters
English male screenwriters
British male television writers
21st-century British screenwriters
21st-century English male writers